Evergreen Cemetery is a  cemetery located in Murfreesboro, Tennessee. The cemetery began as a slave cemetery until its owner Dr. James Maney (the owner of Oaklands Plantation), deeded a  portion of his land to the city of Murfreesboro in 1872 to replace the "Old City Cemetery" which is located near downtown Murfreesboro. The cemetery is the final burial place for many notable people from Tennessee and the grounds are home to centuries old maple, oak and magnolia trees. Some of the trees pre-date the cemetery and a number of the headstones are more than 140 years old.

Evergreen Cemetery is governed by a 34-member board of directors and its current chair is John Rucker Jr. who has served on the board for over 24 years.

It is located at 519 Greenland Drive. Tours of the cemetery, presented by Oaklands Mansion, are also held each year.

Confederate Circle

The Confederate Circle, a mass gravesite, was established in 1890. Some 2,000 – about 90% unnamed – soldiers, are buried in the Circle. The perimeter of the Circle is marked by stone posts bearing the names of each of the Confederate States. Individual burial markers for some of the known dead are located near the corresponding state posts.

The Circle is the site of several observances and memorials throughout the year for local Sons of Confederate Veterans Camps, including Camps #33 and #1355.

Notable burials
 John P. Buchanan (1847–1930), Governor of Tennessee 1891–93
 David W. Dickinson (1808–1845), U.S. Representative
 Harold Earthman (1900–1987), U.S. Representative
 Marvin Leroy Maple (1936–2016), kidnapper of his grandchildren
 Mary Noailles Murfree (1850–1922), author
 Joseph B. Palmer (1825–1890), Confederate General
 Charles Ready (1802–1878), U.S. Representative
 James D. Richardson (1843–1914), U.S. Representative
 Ken Shipp (1928–2021), College and NFL coach

References

External links
 
 

Murfreesboro, Tennessee
Cemeteries in Tennessee
Confederate States of America cemeteries
1872 establishments in Tennessee
Cemeteries established in the 1870s
Burial grounds of the African diaspora in the Western hemisphere